Kadri Fellahoğlu (born 1957) is a Turkish Cypriot politician, who was the mayor of the capital of Northern Cyprus, North Nicosia's Nicosia Turkish Municipality (Turkish: Lefkoşa) between 2013 and 2014. He was born in Paphos.

References

External links
Nicosia Turkish Municipality bio

1957 births
Living people
Mayors of North Nicosia
Turkish Cypriot politicians
Members of the Assembly of the Republic (Northern Cyprus)
Republican Turkish Party politicians
People from Paphos